Dimitri Azar M.D. (born 1959) is an American ophthalmologist, professor, and businessman who leads Twenty Twenty Therapeutics, a joint venture established by Santen and Verily. Dr. Azar has held roles at Novartis and Verily, Alphabet's Life sciences research organization. He served as dean of the College of Medicine at the University of Illinois at Chicago (UIC) from 2011 to 2018.

Education 
Azar received his medical degree from the American University of Beirut, Lebanon. Dr. Azar practiced at the Wilmer Eye Institute at the Johns Hopkins Hospital School of Medicine, and completed his fellowship and residency training at the Massachusetts Eye and Ear Infirmary at Harvard Medical School, where he was a tenured professor of ophthalmology (2003-2006) and senior scientist at the Schepens Eye Research Institute.

Dr. Azar also holds an honorary master's degree from Harvard, as well as an Executive Master of Business Administration from the University of Chicago Booth School of Business.

Academic positions 
Azar has taught as a professor of ophthalmology, bioengineering and pharmacology at UIC, where he also served as head of the Department of Ophthalmology and Visual Sciences and B.A. Field Endowed Chair of Ophthalmologic Research. He is a member of the American Ophthalmological Society, former president of the Chicago Ophthalmological Society, president-elect of the Chicago Medical Society, and former Trustee of the Association of Research in Vision and Ophthalmology (ARVO).

Commercial roles 
Dr. Azar is the Chief Executive Officer of Twenty Twenty Therapeutics, a joint venture between Verily Life Sciences and Santen.  

Azar was a non-executive member of Novartis' Board of Directors from 2012 till 2019. He was also a member of the Audit and Compliance Committee and the Research & Development Committee.

Dr. Azar was a senior director of ophthalmological innovation at Verily, where ophthalmological projects include the development of smart contact lenses, including lenses designed to assist those with presbyopia and an intraocular lens. He was on the board of Verb Surgical Inc.  and sits on the board of the Tear Film and Ocular Surface Society in the US. He also sits on the board of the Himalayan Cataract Project.

Published books 

 Azar DT, Steinert R., Stark WJ, editors. Excimer Laser Therapy: Phototherapeutic Keratectomy Baltimore, MD: Williams & Wilkins; 1997 
 Azar DT. Refractive Surgery. Stamford, CT: Appleton & Lange-Simon and Schuster; 1997 
 Difficult and Complicated Cases in Refractive Surgery, Jorge L. Alió and Dimitri T. Azar, Springer, 2015 
 Pharmacologic Therapy of Ocular Disease (Handbook of Experimental Pharmacology), Scott M. Whitcup and Dimitri T. Azar, Springer 2017 
Albert DM, Jakobiec FA; (Azar DT, and Gragoudas ES associate editors to FAJ).  Principles and Practice of Ophthalmology Second Edition. Philadelphia, PA: Saunders; 1999. 
Jakobiec FA, Azar DT, editors. Pediatric Ophthalmology; International Ophthalmology Clinics; Winter 1992.  
Azar DT, editor.  (Stark WJ, Azar NF, Pineda R, Yoo SH, associate editors).  Intraocular Lenses in Cataract and Refractive Surgery.  Philadelphia PA; Saunders; May 2001. 
Melki SA, Azar DT, editors.  101 Pearls in Refractive, Cataract, and Corneal Surgery.  Thorofare, NJ: Slack; June 2001. 
Azar DT, Koch DD, editors.  LASIK: Fundamentals, Surgical Techniques, and Complications.  New York, NY: Marcel Dekker; November 2002.  
Tsubota K, Boxer-Wachler B, Azar DT, Koch DD, editors.  Hyperopia and Presbyopia.  New York, NY: Marcel Dekker; 2003.  
Foster CS, Azar DT, Dohlman CH, editors.  Smolin and Thoft’s The Cornea: Scientific Foundations and Clinical Practice, 4th Edition. Baltimore, MD: Lippincott Williams & Wilkins; 2005.  
Azar DT, Camellin M, Yee R, editors.  LASEK, PRK, and Excimer Laser Stromal Surface Ablation.  New York, NY: Marcel Dekker; 2005.   
Melki SA, Azar DT, editors.  101 Pearls in Refractive, Cataract, and Corneal Surgery, 2nd Edition. Thorofare, NJ: Slack; 2006. 
Azar DT, editor. (Gatinel D, Hoang-Xuan T, associate editors).  Refractive Surgery, 2nd Edition.  St. Louis, MO: Elsevier-Mosby, 2007. 
Albert DM, Miller JW, editors, Azar DT, Blodi BA, associate editors.  Albert and Jakobiec’s Principles and Practice in Ophthalmology, 3rd Edition. Philadelphia, PA: Elsevier, 2008. 
Alio JL, Azar DT editors. Management of Complications in Refractive Surgery. Springer-Verlag Berlin Heidelberg, 2008. 
Azar DT, editor; BCSC 3. Clinical Optics, American Academy of Ophthalmology. San Francisco, CA; 2012. 
Alio JL, Azar DT, Abbouda A, Asward E, editors. Difficult and Complicated Cases in Refractive Surgery. Springer-Verlag Berlin Heidelberg, 2015  
Azar DT, Rosen E. Yanoff and Duke’s Cataract and Refractive Surgery e-book e-book searchable. 
Whitcup S, Azar DT, editors. Pharmacologic Therapy of Ocular Disease. Springer Heidelberg, 2017 
Alio JL, Azar DT editors. Management of Complications in Refractive Surgery. Second Edition. Springer-verlap Berlin Heidelberg, 2018 
Azar DT, editor.  Refractive Surgery, 3rd Edition.  St. Louis, MO: Elsevier-Mosby, 2019. 
Azar DT, Alio JL, Hallak J, Cortina SM, editors. Surgical management of Astigmatism, Jaypee Publishing, 2020

Awards and recognition 
Azar is an internationally recognized ophthalmic surgeon and prolific researcher. He has been named one of The Best Doctors in America and one of the Castle Connolly Top Doctors in America annually since 1994. He holds multiple committee positions with the American Academy of Ophthalmology, is a member of the American Ophthalmological Association and sits on the board of trustees of the Chicago Ophthalmological Society and the Association of Research in Vision and Ophthalmology. He has received multiple leadership awards, including the 2009 Lans Distinguished Award from the International Society of Refractive Surgery, and the University of Illinois at Chicago Scholar Award. Azar was awarded the Life Achievement award by the American Academy of Ophthalmology for his sustained services to the organization. The International Society of Refractive Surgery, in 2013, awarded him with the Jose Barraquer Award and has also received the University of Illinois at Chicago Scholar Award, and the Distinguished Professor award in 2012. In 2016, Weill Cornell Medical College awarded Azar with the John McLean Medal. 

From 2008 to 2010, Chicago Magazine, in cooperation with Castle Connelly Medical Ltd., listed Azar as one of the top doctors in ophthalmology.  In 2016, he received the Castroviejo Award in recognition of exceptional contributions in support of the Society’s mission from the American Academy of Ophthalmology, as well as the Ramon Castroviejo Award from the Cornea Society. On June 27, 2019, he received an honorary doctoral degree from the University of Balamand, in recognition of his significant lifetime achievements as a world-renown scholar, creative inventor, academician, and eye surgeon.

Other notable awards

External links 

 Novartis profile 
 UIC statement

References 

1959 births
Living people
Eye care in the United States
University of Chicago people
University of Chicago faculty
Lebanese ophthalmologists